Plan B is a Canadian television drama series, that premiered on CBC Television on February 27, 2023.

Premise
An adaptation of the French-language Québécois series  which premiered on Ici Radio-Canada Télé in 2017, the series stars Patrick J. Adams as Phillip, a man who is offered the opportunity to go back in time to make different choices in life to salvage his marriage to Evelyn (Karine Vanasse) and his career after a major personal setback.

Cast
 Patrick J. Adams as Phillip Grimmer
 Karine Vanasse as Evelyn Landry
 François Arnaud as Patrick Landry
 Josh Close as Andy Tremblay
 Troian Bellisario as Miranda Delano

Episodes

Production

Development
The series is produced by KOTV, directed by Jean-François Asselin, Aisling Chin-Yee, and Maxime Giroux, the English adaptation was written by Lynne Kamm, the co-creators of the original French-language series are Jean Francois Asselin and Jacques Drolet.

Casting 
In June 2022, the casting of Patrick J. Adams and Karine Vanasse in the lead roles was announced. In August 2022, it was announced that François Arnaud, Josh Close and Troian Bellisario would be joining the cast in undisclosed roles.

Broadcast

International
International distribution rights to the series have been acquired by Red Arrow Studios.

References

2020s Canadian drama television series
CBC Television original programming
2023 Canadian television series debuts
Canadian time travel television series